The Guaraú River is a river in the state of São Paulo, Brazil.

Course

The basin of the Guaraú River is in the Juréia-Itatins Ecological Station.
The river flows eastward along the foot of the Serra dos Itatins and enters the Atlantic Ocean to the west of Peruíbe.
It separates the Itinguçu State Park to the south from the Balneário Garça Vermelha to the north.
The  state park was created in 2006 to support ecotourism.

See also
List of rivers of São Paulo

References

Sources

Rivers of São Paulo (state)